Tishinovo is a rural locality (a village) in Markovskoye Rural Settlement, Vologodsky District, Vologda Oblast, Russia. The population was 16 as of 2002.

Geography 
Tishinovo is located 26 km southeast of Vologda (the district's administrative centre) by road. Paprikha is the nearest rural locality. the village was a place of pilgrimage for ufologists in 1999-2012

References 

Rural localities in Vologodsky District